Dean Starkey (born March 27, 1967 in Park Ridge, Illinois) is an American pole vaulter. His personal best is 5.92 meters, and he won a bronze medal at the 1997 World Championships. Starkey broke the record for most vaults over 19-feet by an American in 1994 when he leaped over the barrier seven times.

Results
1999: best of 18-4.5... tied for 7th at USA Outdoors (18-0.5).
1998: best of 18-8.25…3rd at USA Outdoors (18-6.5)…5th in Goodwill Games (18-4.5)…ranked #4 U.S. by T&FN.
1997: best of 19-4.75…tied for 5th at USA Indoor (18-8.25)…2nd in USA Outdoors (19-2.25)…bronze in World Champs (19-4.75)…ranked #9 in world (#2 U.S.) by T&FN.
1996: best of 19-0.25…5th in USA Indoor (18-4.5)…7th in Olympic Trials (18-8.25)…ranked #6 U.S. by T&FN.
1995: best of 19-0.25…3rd in USA Indoor (18-8.25)…2nd in USA Outdoors (18-10.25)…8th in World Champs (18-4.5)…7th in GP Final (18-0.5)…ranked #8 in world (#2 U.S.) by T&FN.
1994: best of 19-5…tied for 5th in USA Indoor (18-0.5)…2nd in USA Outdoors (18-8.25)…ranked #4 in world (#1 U.S.) by T&FN.
1993: best of 18-8.25…2nd in USA Outdoors (18-8.25)…tied for 17th in qualifying at World Champs…ranked #8 U.S. by T&FN.
1992: best of 19-4.75…won USA Indoor (18-8.25)…4th in Olympic Trials (18-8.25)…ranked #8 in world (#2 U.S.) by T&FN.
1991: best of 19-0.75…no height at USA Outdoors…ranked #6 U.S. by T&FN.
1990: best of 18-8.25…tied for 3rd at USA Outdoors…ranked #7 U.S. by T&FN.
1989: best of 18-8…won NCAA Indoor (18-6.5)…tied for 7th at NCAA…4th in USA Outdoors…2nd in World University Games…ranked #8 U.S. by T&FN.
1988: best of 18-3.25…won NCAA Indoor (17-10.5)…3rd at NCAA…7th in USA Outdoors…tied for 17th in qualifying at USA Champs.
1987: best of 18-0.5…no height in NCAA Indoor…no height in qualifying at NCAA…no height in qualifying at USA Outdoors.
1986: best of 17-7.75…no height in NCAA Indoor…tied for 15th in qualifying at NCAA…tied for 3rd at USA Juniors.
1985: best of 16-3…2nd in Illinois HS state meet…11th at USA Juniors.
1984: best of 15-2.

References

1967 births
Living people
American male pole vaulters
World Athletics Championships medalists
Universiade medalists in athletics (track and field)
Universiade silver medalists for the United States
Medalists at the 1989 Summer Universiade
Competitors at the 1998 Goodwill Games